Arabella Churchill (23 February 1648 – 30 May 1730) was the mistress of King James II and VII, and the mother of four of his children (surnamed FitzJames, that is, "son of James").

Life
She was a daughter of Sir Winston Churchill and sister of John Churchill, 1st Duke of Marlborough; her other brothers were George Churchill, Admiral of the Blue and General Charles Churchill. The Churchills' loyalty to the royal household was ardent; their only feeling about Arabella's seduction by King James II "seems to have been a joyful surprise that so plain a girl had attained such high preferment".  

James, then Duke of York, began his adulterous affair with Arabella Churchill, around 1665, while he was still married to Anne Hyde. Churchill became the duchess's lady-in-waiting in that year, and gave birth to two children during Anne's lifetime. Churchill was described as a "tall creature, pale-faced, and nothing but skin and bone".  

Courtiers cackled "at her appearance until she fell off her horse in front of a crowd, displaying her magnificent legs". One awestruck witness marvelled that "limbs of such exquisite beauty could belong to Miss Churchill's face".

Charles II, who was baffled by his brother's predilection for plain women, joked that his confessor must impose them as a penance. She often displayed the quick wit and lively intelligence which bound James to her through ten years and four children. 

On 1 June 1680 at the Church of Holy Trinity, Minories, London, she married Charles Godfrey and had three more children. They lived happily together for more than three decades.
Godfrey died in 1714, at the age of 67. She survived him by 16 years, dying in 1730 aged 82.

Children

Children with James II of England
Henrietta FitzJames (1667 – 3 April 1730)
James FitzJames, 1st Duke of Berwick (1670–1734) 
Henry FitzJames, 1st Duke of Albemarle (1673–1702)
Arabella FitzJames (1674 – 7 November 1704); became a nun

From her children Henrietta, Countess of Newcastle, and James, Duke of Berwick, she is an ancestor of the Earls Spencer and Diana, Princess of Wales as well as of the Dukes of Berwick, the later Dukes of Alba and of Cayetana Fitz-James Stuart, 18th Duchess of Alba, the person with the most noble titles in the world.

Children with Charles Godfrey
Francis Godfrey
Charlotte Godfrey, born before 1685, married Hugh Boscawen, 1st Viscount Falmouth
Elizabeth Godfrey, married Edmund Dunch, son of Hungerford Dunch

References

External links
WorldRoots Royalty Pages

1648 births
1730 deaths
Mistresses of James II of England
Arabella Churchill
Arabella